The Saga of Hemp Brown is a 1958 American CinemaScope Western film directed by Richard Carlson and starring Rory Calhoun and Beverly Garland.

Plot
A U.S. cavalry officer, Hemp Brown (Rory Calhoun), runs into some serious trouble when the party of civilians and troops he's bringing to a nearby Army fort is ambushed. A woman is killed during the gunfight, and money is stolen by the bandits. The leader of the gang, Jed Givens (John Larch), is an acquaintance of Brown, who implicates the fugitive during the subsequent trial. But Brown is court-martialed and booted from the Army. Brown tracks down Givens to restore honor to his name.

Cast
 Rory Calhoun as Hemp Brown 
 Beverly Garland as Mona Langley
 John Larch aa Jed Givens
 Russell Johnson as Hook
 Fortunio Bonanova as Serge Bolanos
 Trevor Bardette as Judge Rawlins
 Morris Ankrum as Bo Slauter
 Addison Richards as Col. Ford
Tom London as Floyd Leacock (uncredited)

See also
 List of American films of 1958

References

External links
 
 
 

1958 films
American Western (genre) films
1958 Western (genre) films
Films directed by Richard Carlson
Universal Pictures films
Western (genre) cavalry films
1950s English-language films
1950s American films